The South Orange Open, formerly known as the Eastern Grass Court Championships, is a defunct Grand Prix affiliated tennis tournament played from 1970 to 1983. It was held in South Orange, New Jersey in the United States and played on outdoor grass courts from 1970 to 1974, and then played on outdoor clay courts from 1975 to 1983. There were men's and women's singles tournaments as well as men's, women's, and mixed doubles.

Ilie Năstase was the most successful player at the tournament, winning the singles competition three times on two different surfaces and the doubles competition twice with American Jimmy Connors.

Results

Men's singles

Men's doubles

See also
 Orange Spring Tournament
 Orange LTC Open
 Orange Invitation

External links
 Orange Lawn Tennis Club 1880–1980 (Part 2)
 ATP results archive

Hard court tennis tournaments in the United States
Grass court tennis tournaments
Clay court tennis tournaments
Defunct tennis tournaments in the United States
Grand Prix tennis circuit
Tennis tournaments in New Jersey
1970 establishments in New Jersey
Recurring sporting events established in 1970
1983 disestablishments in New Jersey
South Orange, New Jersey
Recurring sporting events disestablished in 1983
South Orange Open